Craig Ackerman is the current play-by-play announcer for the Houston Rockets of the National Basketball Association (NBA).

Craig was born to Gerald and Bonnie Ackerman on August 27, 1974 in Cuyahoga Falls, Ohio.

He graduated from Sam Houston State University in 1997, where he met his wife Shannon. They were married in August 1998. They have two children, CJ (Craig Jr.), 23 and Chase, 17.

References 

http://www.nba.com/rockets/news/Ackerman_named_New_Voice_of_th-276011-34.html
http://www.chron.com/sports/rockets/article/Ackerman-to-take-over-role-of-Rockets-radio-voice-1789751.php

1974 births
Living people
Houston Rockets announcers
National Basketball Association broadcasters
Houston Cougars football announcers
College basketball announcers in the United States
College football announcers